Olga Dmitrievna Potachova (born 26 June 1976 in Potsdam, Germany) is a Russian volleyball player. She was a member of the national team that won the silver medal in the Sydney 2000 Olympic Games. She is 2.04 metres (6 ft  8.5 in) tall, making her one of the tallest female athletes in the world.
She had to retire in 2004 due to health problems.

External links
Uralochka VC profile

1976 births
Living people
Russian women's volleyball players
Olympic volleyball players of Russia
Volleyball players at the 2000 Summer Olympics
Olympic silver medalists for Russia
Russian expatriate sportspeople in Germany
Sportspeople from Potsdam
German women's volleyball players
Olympic medalists in volleyball
Medalists at the 2000 Summer Olympics
20th-century Russian women
21st-century Russian women